Menipo is an island in the Lesser Sunda Islands in Indonesia, separated from Timor Island by a narrow strait. It is home to a variety of wildlife, including Timor deer, wild pigs, turtles and crocodiles. Humans use it for fishing, snorkeling, swimming and surfing.

References

Solor Archipelago